The Canadian Journal of Physics is a monthly peer-reviewed scientific journal covering research in physics.  It was established in 1929 as the Canadian Journal of Research, Section A: Physical Sciences, obtaining its current title in 1951. The journal is published monthly by the NRC Research Press and edited by Robert Mann (University of Waterloo) and Marco Merkli (Memorial University of Newfoundland). The journal is affiliated with the Canadian Association of Physicists.

Abstracting and indexing
The journal is abstracted and indexed in: 

According to the Journal Citation Reports, the journal has a 2021 impact factor of 1.358.

References

External links

Publications established in 1929
Physics journals
Canadian Science Publishing academic journals
English-language journals
Monthly journals